Condition Red is the fourth studio album by the German power metal band Iron Savior. It continues the science fiction story that the band introduced on their debut album Iron Savior and continued on Unification, the Interlude EP, and Dark Assault. It is the last album to feature keyboardist Andreas Kück and bassist Jan-Sören Eckert (who would later return in 2011 on The Landing).

Track listing

Personnel 
Iron Savior
 Piet Sielcklead vocals, guitar, backing vocals
 Joachim "Piesel" Küstnerguitar, backing vocals
 Andreas Kückkeyboards, backing vocals
 Jan-Sören Eckertbass, backing vocals
 Thomas Nackdrums and percussion

Additional musicians
 Rolf Köhlerbacking vocals

Production
 Piet Sielckproducer, engineer, mixing, mastering, cover artwork concept, booklet concept
 Iron Savioradditional production
 Marisa Jacobigraphic design
 Jo Kirchherrphotography

Additional information 
 Drums and percussion recorded at Hammer Musik Studio, Hamburg in October 2001.

References 

Iron Savior albums
2002 albums
Noise Records albums